The Lawrence Welk Show is an American televised musical variety show hosted by big band leader Lawrence Welk. The series aired locally in Los Angeles for four years, from 1951 to 1955, then nationally for another 16 years on ABC from 1955 to 1971, followed by 11 years in first-run syndication from 1971 to 1982. Repeat episodes are broadcast in the United States by Public Broadcasting Service (PBS) stations. These airings incorporate an original program—usually, a color broadcast from 1965 to 1982—in its entirety. In place of the commercials, newer performance and interview clips from the original stars and/or a family member of the performers are included; these clips are occasionally updated.

Broadcast history
On May 11, 1951, The Lawrence Welk Show began as a local program on KTLA in Los Angeles, the flagship station of the Paramount Television Network and the first commercial television station in California and west of the Mississippi River. The original show was broadcast from the since-demolished Aragon Ballroom at Venice Beach. In 1954, Paramount announced plans to distribute the show nationwide, plans that never materialized due to Paramount's feuds with DuMont Television Network that led to the collapse of both.

The show made its national television debut on ABC Television on July 2, 1955, and was initially produced at the Hollywood Palladium, moving to the ABC studios at Prospect and Talmadge (stage 5) in Hollywood shortly afterwards. For 23 of its 27 years on the air, the show would originate there.

The 1965–66 season was taped at the Hollywood Palace because that was ABC's only West Coast TV studio at the time equipped for live or taped color production; Welk had insisted that the show go color in 1965 because he believed that being broadcast in color was critical to the continued success of his program. Once a couple of studios at the ABC Prospect and Talmadge facilities had been converted to color in 1966, the show moved back there. The show also left the Prospect and Talmadge studios between 1976 and 1979, returning to the Hollywood Palace for one season, then moving to CBS's Television City studios in 1977 and staying for two seasons, before coming back to the Prospect and Talmadge studios in 1979 and remaining there for the rest of its run.

The show aired on ABC until 1971. When the show was canceled by the head of programming there, Welk formed his own production company and continued airing the show, on local stations and, often from 7 to 8 P.M. Eastern Time on Saturdays over some of the ABC affiliates on which he had previously appeared, along with some stations affiliated with other networks and some independent television stations. The syndicated version of the program aired from 1971 to 1982.

When the show debuted nationwide, The Lawrence Welk Show was billed as the Dodge Dancing Party in 1955 and 1956. From 1956 to 1959, Lawrence Welk was broadcast two nights per week. The second show's title was Lawrence Welk Presents Top Tunes and New Talent (1956–58) and then Lawrence Welk's Plymouth Show, after another Chrysler vehicle (1958–59). The Plymouth show was the first American television program to air in stereophonic sound. Because stereophonic television had not yet been invented (it would be 25 more years before it would become standard), ABC instead simulcast the show on its radio network, with the TV side airing one audio channel and the radio side airing the other; viewers would tune in both the TV and the radio to achieve the stereophonic effect. Starting with the 1959–60 season the two shows were merged into The Lawrence Welk Show, reverting to monophonic broadcasts. During this early period, Chrysler also provided the show's announcers: Lou Crosby represented the Dodge shows, while James Narz represented Plymouth. (When it became known that Chrysler's rival Ford employed Narz's older brother Jack, they changed James's name to Tom Kennedy to avoid confusion between the two; Kennedy was moved to Date with the Angels in 1957.)

The primary sponsor of The Lawrence Welk Show was Dodge (automobile maker). In 1960, Geritol (a multivitamin) took over sponsorship; Sominex (sleep aid), Aqua Velva (aftershave), Serutan (laxative), Universal Appliances (manufacturer of home appliances), Polident (a denture cleanser), Ocean Spray (fruit juice) and Sinclair Oil (automobile fuel) were some of the other companies or brands which served as associate sponsors for a short time. (During later years, a number of Welk cast members appeared in commercials for many of the show's sponsors, filmed specifically to air during Welk broadcasts.) From then onward, Bob Warren handled announcing duties.

Move to syndication and public television
While the show was highly rated and continued to attract more audiences, ABC canceled it in 1971 for two reasons. The first was that the network had to cut three-and-a-half hours per week of prime-time programming, owing to the institution of the Prime Time Access Rule in 1971; the other was the fact that Welk's viewership was mostly of people over forty-five, mostly because of the music he chose to play, but also because younger viewers, the core viewing target that networks coveted, were either out during the Saturday night slot, or were watching one of the other networks. Throughout the early 1970s, several variety shows (including Welk's), but ranging from long-running series such as The Ed Sullivan Show, The Hollywood Palace and The Red Skelton Show to more contemporary shows such as Hee Haw, The Johnny Cash Show and This Is Tom Jones) were pulled from network schedules (particularly ABC and CBS) in a demographic move known colloquially as the "rural purge".

In response to ABC's move, Welk started his own production company and continued producing the show for syndication. Some independent stations put it in its old Saturday timeslot, and in many cases, it drew higher ratings than the network shows scheduled at that time. In many markets, the syndicated Lawrence Welk aired before the start of network prime-time on Saturday nights (7 p.m. Eastern Time); also in many areas, it competed against another show that was canceled by CBS and resurrected in syndication, also in 1971 — Hee Haw. Welk's program was among a group of syndicated niche programs, others including Hee Haw and Soul Train, that flourished during this era. (The success of Lawrence Welk and Hee Haw in syndication, and the network decisions that led to their respective cancellations, were the inspiration for a novelty song called "The Lawrence Welk-Hee Haw Counter-Revolution Polka", performed by Roy Clark, one of the co-stars of Hee Haw.)

Lawrence Welk retired in 1982; at the time of his retirement, he was 79 years old, making him at the time the oldest host of a regularly scheduled US entertainment television series (a feat later surpassed by game show host Bob Barker in 2003 and later by actress and comedian Betty White in 2012). Classic shows — largely, from 1967 to 1982 — were repackaged with new footage (either Welk or the show's cast introducing segments) for syndication during the 1982–1983 season as Memories with Lawrence Welk, after which they were withdrawn from distribution for a short time. In 1985, The Lawrence Welk Christmas Reunion was produced. It was the last show in which Welk appeared with the "musical family" and his grandchildren on Christmas Eve at Lawrence Welk's home.

In March 1987, the Oklahoma Educational Television Authority produced and released a documentary film, Lawrence Welk: Television's Music Man, hosted by Kathy Lennon of The Lennon Sisters. The film was a retrospective on Welk's life and career, featuring interviews with surviving members of Welk's "musical family", and scenes from the show; it was part of a new approach to pledge drive programming that aimed to lure donors with popular music and nostalgia, an approach that has since become standard at other public television stations. The film was so successful that the OETA acquired rerun rights to the program and began offering them to stations nationwide that October. Welk's segments from Memories with Lawrence Welk were used until his death, after which select members of the "musical family" took over as hosts. Reruns continue to air to this day (in many markets airing on Saturday nights at 7 pm, the same time the show aired during the latter years of its original run), with new and updated interviews with surviving cast members. The shows are occasionally "recut" and interspersed with segments from other episodes for time and diversity purposes; for example, a rebroadcast of Gail Farrell's 1969 debut featured an added song by Anacani, who did not join the show until 1973.

Nielsen ratings
The show was most highly rated during the mid to late 1960's and was a top 30 hit for five seasons, according to ClassicTVHits.com's ratings database.
1964–65: No. 30 (22.00 rating)
1965–66: No. 19 (22.40 rating)
1966–67: No. 12 (22.79 rating)
1967–68: No. 17 (21.90 rating)
1968–69: No. 29 (20.50 rating)

Format
The show would often open by showing bubbles floating around and was accompanied by a sound effect of a bottle of champagne opening, including the opening theme (originally "Bubbles in the Wine", composed by Welk and Frank Loesser, later replaced with a derivative theme, "Champagne Time", and fanfare composed by George Cates). Each week, Welk would introduce the theme of the show, which usually inspired joyous singing and/or patriotic fervor. He was most known for delivering these monologues in a distinctive German accent (this despite being born and raised in North Dakota), which was parodied in popular culture (even by Welk himself: the two books he authored, Wunnerful, Wunnerful! and Ah-One, Ah-Two! were so titled because they were his catchphrases). This was evident from his mispronunciations of script on cue cards. One such story, related by Jo Ann Castle on The Mike Douglas Show, has him introducing a medley of World War I tunes as "songs from World War Eye". Also, from his autobiography Wunnerful, Wunnerful! he bemoans his accent, and in some of his pronunciations of "wonderful" in the show he can be heard forcing the D.

If the number was more of a dance tune, Welk would frequently dance with ladies from the audience, for which he became somewhat known. For certain songs (mainly the instrumentals performed by the orchestra), the couples in attendance were also allowed to dance at the Ballroom. Many of the show's songs were performed as part of a skit; while a handful of skits were common throughout the show's run, during a short period in the mid-1970s (about the same time The Semonski Sisters were featured performers on the show), the show consisted almost entirely of them.

Welk often demonstrated multiple times on-camera how the champagne bottle sound was created, by placing a finger in his mouth, releasing it to make the popping sound, and making a soft hissing sound to simulate the bubbles escaping the bottle. One such instance is part of the opening sequence of the public television reruns seen today.

Welk frequently had performers sing and play standards from the big band era and the first half of the 20th century. He had a particular admiration for those composers contemporary with him, such as Hoagy Carmichael, Henry Mancini, Johnny Mercer, Cole Porter, and Harry Warren; although the show's repertoire was in reality much broader, and would often include pop songs from the 1950s, 1960s, and 1970s—Welk even devoted an entire show to the music of the 1970s in 1978—as well as country music, patriotic music, and religious music, especially if it was thought to appeal to older listeners (and, as Welk stated in 1956, "as long as it's done in the champagne style"). In one of his most infamous incidents, he asked singers Gail Farrell and Dick Dale to perform Brewer & Shipley's hit song "One Toke Over the Line" (a mock gospel tune riddled with drug references) as a modern spiritual, apparently oblivious to the meaning of the word "toke." Brewer responded that although it was "absurd", the duo "got more publicity than we could pay for" from the out-of-place performance. Welk, for his part, blamed ABC for pressuring him into including the song, among others he felt did not fit the show's format.

Almost all of the music performed on the show was done in-house by the show's "Musical Family." Special musical guests were a rare and irregular occurrence; these ranged from Henry Mancini to more contemporary artists such as banjoist Eddie Peabody, surf rock group The Chantays, novelty artist Stan Boreson, and country singers Charley Pride and Barbara Mandrell.

The closing theme during the syndicated years, with lyrics often performed by the "Musical Family", was "Adios, Au Revoir, Auf Wiedersehen" (composed by George Cates). A recording of the song has been edited over the updated credits on PBS reruns.

The "Musical Family"

Welk employed many musicians and singers, which were known in the press as his "Musical Family". Most members of the Musical Family had specific, well-defined roles within the context of the show, generally specializing in one type of performance (for instance, the show had two pianists, but one would specialize in ragtime piano while the other would handle easy listening pieces; the show's numerous singers and dancers were similarly typecast). One of the most prominent positions in the Musical Family was the "Champagne Lady", who always sang a down-tempo solo number toward the end of each show.

These musicians were bound by an unofficial set of morals (artistic and personal) dictated by Welk, and if he believed the audience did not find them wholesome enough, they would be fired. According to popular belief, former "Champagne Lady" Alice Lon was fired in 1959 for crossing her legs on a desk, which was something Welk didn't like. After he fired Lon, thousands of letters filled the ABC mailroom, demanding an apology, and that she be rehired. Welk tried to get Lon back but she refused.

In later years however, it was revealed that along with the "cheesecake" incident, another one of the reasons for Lon's departure was money; she was supporting three young sons and wanted a raise. A further reason was a dispute over what kind of songs she would be singing, and since Welk insisted on playing what he felt his audiences wanted to hear, generally older "standards", she rebelled against such restrictions. (Both on TV and in live performances, Welk did not shy away from allowing more modern musical styles such as light rock and roll to be performed.)

After two years and a string of short-lived vocalists, Norma Zimmer was hired, starting in 1960. Zimmer stayed with Welk for the rest of the show's run.

Another example of being bound by Welk's set of morals was famed clarinetist Pete Fountain, renowned for his New Orleans-style jazz. He was a valued member of the Welk cast, who was rumored to have quit when Welk objected to his efforts to "jazz up" the Christmas standard "Silver Bells" on the 1958 Christmas show. In an interview, Fountain admitted he left Welk because "Champagne and bourbon don't mix." (The departure was amicable; Fountain would reappear in Welk reunion shows after the show ended.)

Welk relied on fan letters to tell him who was popular and who was not. Often, performers who received a positive reaction were prominently featured on future shows, while those who did not meet muster with the audience saw their solo opportunities diminish and sometimes were eventually let go.

Among the performers that were wildly popular with audiences during the years it was on ABC were The Lennon Sisters, Joe Feeney, Steve Smith, Larry Hooper, Jo Ann Castle and electric guitarist Buddy Merrill, just to name a few. Lynn Anderson, Clay Hart, and Ava Barber used the show as a springboard to launch their own successful careers as country music solo artists. At the height of the show's popularity, members of the Musical Family were featured in several celebrity tabloid magazines alongside other mainstream television and movie stars.

Tap dancer Arthur Duncan became the second African-American to appear regularly on a sponsored television variety program, and the first since 1951, when he was hired as a permanent music maker by Welk in 1964. (The first was Teddy Wilson, a member of Benny Goodman's orchestra who appeared along with the orchestra on the short-lived Star Time throughout its 1950–51 run.) Duncan was already marginally famous through his appearances on The Betty White Show in 1954.

Producers and directors
James Hobson (also known as Jim Hobson) served longest as producer (1962–1982) and director of The Lawrence Welk Show. Hobson died on April 26, 2013, in Santa Monica Hospital, California.

Episode status
The surviving episodes from the first 10 seasons on ABC, which began in 1955, exist today as black and white kinescopes or videotape, as the show was broadcast live for the first 10 years, right up through the 1964–1965 season. A few of these have been broadcast on public television. Most episodes shown on PBS stations today are from around 1965 to 1982 (the majority being from the syndicated run), but some older black and white episodes were added to the rotation in recent years and can be found on YouTube.

Beginning with the 1965–1966 season, the episodes were recorded in color. It is assumed the color episodes exist intact. The very first color episode of the show, which aired in September 1965, was taped on-location at the Escondido resort near San Diego, in which Welk had a financial and ownership interest. It is occasionally shown on PBS stations; the PBS rebroadcast is introduced by Bobby Burgess and also Mary Lou Metzger.

Surviving episodes on YouTube are posted constantly with full shows and clips in all ranges of video quality, while most are ripped from the reruns of the show on TV, some videos on YouTube, do contain original unseen content (on the reruns) of the show. There are also several YouTube channels made dedicated to the show including the most popular, "Lawrence Welk Show Fans", "ahoneahtwo", "Lawrence Welk LPs", etc.

DVD status and Welk specials aired on public television
Neither the Welk Organization nor the Oklahoma Educational Television Authority have released any episodes of The Lawrence Welk Show on home video, nor are there any plans to do so. Welk Musical Family specials, however, are available on DVD, and can be obtained with a donation during reairs on local PBS stations.

1991 – "A Champagne Toast to the Big Bands"
1992 – "The Lennon Sisters: Easy to Remember"
1993 – "From the Heart: A Tribute to Lawrence Welk and the American Dream"
1994 – "The Lawrence Welk Holiday Special: Great Moments & Memories"
1995 – "Lawrence Welk: Then & Now"
1995 – "A Lawrence Welk Family Christmas"
1997 – "From Lawrence Welk: To America With Love"
1998 – "Lawrence Welk’s Favorite Holidays"
1999 – "Lawrence Welk’s Songs of Faith"
2000 – "Lawrence Welk Milestones & Memories"
2003 – "Lawrence Welk: God Bless America"
2005 – "Lawrence Welk Precious Memories"
2007 – "Lawrence Welk's TV Treasures"
2009 – "Welk Stars Through The Years"
2011 – "Lawrence Welk's Big Band Splash"

In popular culture

In music

Accordion pop/rock band Those Darn Accordions recorded "The Story of Lawrence Welk" on their 1994 album Squeeze This!, a comic retelling of Welk's life story which references his television series, incorporating musical bits from "Bubbles in the Wine" and name-dropping series regulars Alice Lon, The Lennon Sisters and even its sponsorships from Dodge and Geritol.
Comic Stan Freberg, known for recording authentic, often scathing satirical renditions of hit songs of the 1950s, created a parody of the show in a song called "Wun'erful Wun'erful (Sides uh-one and uh-two)", which became a Top 30 hit in 1957. Originally performed on Freberg's CBS Radio series, the single spoofed the musicianship among some of Welk's musicians (including Welk himself). The record was arranged by Billy May, who handled the music on Freberg sessions and was known to despise Welk's style of music. Working with May and Freberg, who portrayed Welk, were some of Hollywood's best studio musicians, some of them jazz veterans who held Welk's music in equal contempt. Welk was not pleased by the record, built around satirical out-of-tune performances and an out-of-control "bubble machine" that sent the entire Aragon Ballroom out to sea.
Dickie Goodman also used Welk as a source for inspiration and a target of satire on his 1959 novelty single, "Stagger Lawrence", which featured an episode of the show being repeatedly interrupted by Lloyd Price's version of the blues piece "Stagger Lee."
The show is one of two that serve as the main subjects of the 1972 song "The Lawrence Welk-Hee Haw Counter-Revolution Polka," the other being Hee Haw (Hee Haw host Roy Clark sang the song). Both programs had been canceled by their respective networks in 1971, only to continue in first-run syndication (and be enormously popular) for several years thereafter.

In television
On October 4, 2008, NBC's Saturday Night Live parodied the show with Fred Armisen taking on the role as the Maestro, whose accent switches on and off for different words, and is often obscured by far too many bubbles. The sketch features the singing Maharelle sisters (who are trying to imitate the Lennon Sisters although they are talked about as different cast) "all the way from the Finger Lakes". Three of the four sisters are beautiful and perky but the fourth, Dooneese Maharelle (Kristen Wiig), is physically deformed (with a large forehead, bad teeth and tiny non-functioning hands the size of a doll's) and apparently deranged. [This version notably used Freberg's sound-alike of the theme song.] The skit - and Wiig's character in particular - proved so popular with audiences that the Welk parody became a recurring sketch over the next few seasons, featuring appearances from the likes of Jon Hamm, Melissa McCarthy, Will Ferrell, and Betty White, amongst others. The satirical efforts differed considerably from earlier satires such as Stan Freberg's, that mocked the music, the musicianship and Welk's clumsy patter between songs.
In "The Ride", episode 6.09 of The Sopranos, Paulie Walnuts watches The Lawrence Welk Show with his aunt, Marianucci Gualtieri, who refers to it as The Lawrence Welk's Program. They have very little dialogue and the show is prominently featured in the scene. The music from the show leads into the credits.
The 1970s sitcom Welcome Back, Kotter used the Welk show as a source of comedic material. One episode involved a scene when Arnold Horshack, upon noticing a kitchen sink overflowing with bubbles, yelled "HELP! WE'RE BEING INVADED BY LAWRENCE WELK!"

Singers and performers
All of these singers and performers were part of the Musical Family, with Welk on the lead.
The Aldridge Sisters, singers (1977–1982)
Anacani, singer, dancer (1973–1982)
Lynn Anderson, singer (1967–1968)
Ron Anderson, singer (1980–1982), Gail, Ron & Michael
Ava Barber, singer (1974–1982)
The Blenders, singers (1965–1967)
Barbara Boylan, dancer (1961–1967, 1979)
Bob Ballard, conductor (1976-1982)
Bobby Burgess, dancer (1961–1982)
Jo Ann Castle, honky-tonk pianist (1959–1969)
Joey Schmidt, accordionist (1977-1982)
Jamie Corey, singer (1976-1977)
Dick Dale, saxophonist/singer (1955–1982)
Larry Dean, singer (1956–1962)
Ken Delo, singer (1969–1982)
Arthur Duncan, tap dancer (1964–1982)
Ralna English, singer (1969–1982), Guy & Ralna
Tanya Falan, singer (1967–1977)
Gail Farrell, singer (1969–1982), Gail, Sandi & Mary Lou and Gail, Ron & Michael
Joe Feeney, singer (1957–1982)
Myron Floren, accordionist (1955–1982), assistant conductor (1955–1973)
Sally Flynn, singer (1968–1972), Sandi & Sally
Sandi Griffiths, singer (1968–1980), Sandi & Sally and Gail, Sandi & Mary Lou
Clay Hart, guitarist/singer (1969–1975)
Larry Hooper, singer/piano (1951–1969, 1973–1980)
Guy Hovis, singer (1970–1982), Guy & Ralna
Jack Imel, percussionist/tap dancer (1957–1982)
Cissy King, dancer (1967–1978)
The Lennon Sisters, singers (1955–1968)
Alice Lon, singer/Champagne Lady (1955–1959)
Mary Lou Metzger, singer/tap dancer (1970–1982), Gail, Sandi & Mary Lou
Tom Netherton, singer (1973–1982)
Natalie Nevins, singer (1965–1969)
Cubby O'Brien, drummer/singer (1958-1959)
Elaine Niverson, dancer (1979–1982) 
The Otwell Twins, singers (1977–1982)
Maurice Pearson, singer (1957–1960)
Bob Ralston, piano/organ soloist, musical arranger, dancer, singer (1963–1982)
Curt Ramsey, musical arranger, trumpet player, singer, and librarian (1955–1982), Curt Ramsey Quintet
Michael Redman, singer (1980–1982), Gail, Ron & Michael
Jimmy Roberts, singer (1955–1982)
The Semonski Sisters, singers (1975–1977)
Bob Smale, pianist (1969-1982)
Steve Smith, singer (1965–1969), The Blenders from 1965 to 1967
Kathie Sullivan, singer (1976–1982)
Jim Turner, guitarist/singer (1979–1982)
Andra Willis, singer (1967–1969)
Norma Zimmer, singer/Champagne Lady (1960–1982)

The band
Orie Amodeo, saxophone/reeds (1955–1970)
George Aubry, saxophone/reeds (1951–1957)
Norman Bailey, trumpet (1955–1973)
Big Tiny Little, ragtime piano (1955–1959)
Don Bonnee, saxophone/reeds (1959–1962)
Bobby Bruce, violin (1964–1967)
Jerry Burke, piano/organ (1951–1965)
George Cates, music supervisor (1955–1982), conductor (1973-1982)
Dick Cathcart, trumpet (1962–1968)
Buddy Clark, bass/tuba (1966–1967)
Mahlon Clark, saxophone/reeds (1962–1968)
Henry Cuesta, saxophone/clarinet (1972–1982)
Bob Davis, saxophone/reeds (1965–1982)
Art Depew, trumpet (1957–1965)
Kurt Dieterle, violin (1959–1961)
Jack Dumont, saxophone/reeds (1959–1962)
Dave Edwards, saxophone/reeds (1968–1979)
Ernie Ehrhardt, cellist (1978–1982)
Pete Fountain, saxophonist/clarinet (1957–1959)
Jimmy Getzhoff, violin (1960–1962)
Woody Guidry, trumpet (1955–1956)
Charlotte Harris, cellist (1961–1978)
Stanley Harris, violist (1959–1960)
Bob Havens, trombone (1960–1982)
Buddy Hayes, bass/tuba (1955–1966)
Jimmy Henderson, trombone (1957–1959)
Skeets Herfurt, saxophone/reeds (1979–1982)
Laroon Holt (1973–1982)
Peanuts Hucko, saxophone/clarinet (1970–1972)
Paul Humphrey, drummer (1976–1982)
Harry Hyams, viola (1961–1982)
Dick Kesner, violin (1955–1960)
Johnny Klein, drummer (1955–1976)
Russ Klein, saxophone/reeds (1957–1982)
Neil Levang, guitarist (1959–1982)
Barney Liddell, trombone (1955–1982)
Bob Lido, violin/performer (1955–1982)
Ray Linn, trumpet (1968–1969)
Joe Livoti, violin (1962–1982)
Pete Lofthouse, trombone (1955–1965)
Warren Luening, trumpet (1959–1960)
Richard Maloof, bass/tuba (1967–1982)
Freddie Mandock, saxophone (1969-1977)
Sam McCadden, saxophone/performer (1955–1980)
Mickey McMahan, trumpet (1967–1982)
Jack Martin, saxophone/reeds (1955–1959)
Buddy Merrill, guitarist (1955–1974)
Bill Page, saxophone/reeds (1955–1965)
Aladdin Pallante, violin/performer (1955–1967)
Charlie Parlato, trumpet (1962–1982)
Jim Porter, trumpet (1965)
David Pratt, cellist (1959–1961)
Bob Ralston, piano/organ (1963–1982)
Rocky Rockwell, trumpet (1955–1962)
Mischa Russell, violin (1962–1964)
Ambrose Russo, violin (1962–1964)
Frank Scott, piano/harpsichord (1955–1969)
Bob Smale, piano (1969–1982)
Don Staples, trombone (1965–1982)
George Thow, trumpet/production staff (1956–1982)
Kenny Trimble, trombone (1957–1982)
Billy Wright, violin (1957–1959)
Rubin Zarchy, trumpet (1968)
Johnny Zell, trumpet (1968–1982)
Rick Sweet, steel guitar (1958-1961)

Rose Weiss was the long-term Welk costume designer and manager.

Announcers
James Narz (1956–1957)
Lou Crosby (1955–1960)
Bob Warren (1960–1982)

References

External links

"America's Biggest Little Band Made History" by Jay Landers Contains information on one continuous page, with photos.
1955 28 minute The Lawrence Welk Show - Pilot Available for download from the Internet Archive, it was made to get the "local" television show picked up as a network series.
Official Welk Musical Family Blog
OETA's Lawrence Welk Show page List the release dates past and future (actual airdates on local PBS stations could be slightly later) with capsule description of the edited shows being broadcast on public television. Missing are references to the airdates of the original shows.
WelkNotes.com Includes complete synopsis and song lists for the edited shows from OETA with air dates of the original shows; complete information not available for new shows until after they are released.

Lawrence Welk Music Arrangements database Provides access to some 10,000 music arrangements used on the Lawrence Welk Show, now preserved at North Dakota State University.
Stars of the Lawrence Welk Show
The Lawrence Welk Show episodes on Hulu (currently consisting only of 21 black-and-white episodes from prior to 1965)

1951 American television series debuts
1982 American television series endings
1950s American music television series
1960s American music television series
1970s American music television series
1980s American music television series
1950s American variety television series
1960s American variety television series
1970s American variety television series
1980s American variety television series
American Broadcasting Company original programming
Black-and-white American television shows
English-language television shows
First-run syndicated television programs in the United States
PBS original programming
Lawrence Welk